VEGAS is a Greek group formed in 2008 and consists of three members: vocalists ZeRaw and Katerina Koukouraki, and DJ Airth on the consoles.

Discography

Albums
2009: Vegas
2011: Season 2
2012: VEGAS...THE STORY SO FAR

Singles
Hrthe i Stigmi (2010) (feat finalist of Greece's Next Top Model)
Tous Ponaei (2009)
Mi Stamatas (2010)
Fsssst! Vegas! (2010)
Tis Manas Sou (I Agkalia) (2009)
De Tha Fygeis (2009)
Fili (2010)
You Killed Me (2010)
Mad About You (2011)
Gia sena (2011)
Pio Psila (2012)
Panta Kalokairi (2012)
Prospatho (2012)
Osa Eixa (2012)
Akoma (2013)
Xilies Fores (2013)
Pedio Maxis (2014)
Paidia tis Nixtas (2014)
Solo (2015)
Apopse (2015)
Otan Me Filas (2018) / Music credits: Tim Aeby, Claydee, Zeraw, Sofia Papavasileiou

Awards and nominations

Mad Video Music Awards

|-
|rowspan=7 |2010
|Tous Ponaei
|Video Clip Hip-Hop/Urban
|
|-
|Tous Ponaei
|Mad Radio 106.2 Track of the Year
|
|-
|Tous Ponaei
|Stixos-Ataka
|
|-
|Hrthe H Stigmi
|Sexy Video Clip
|
|-
|Hrthe H Stigmi
|Fashion Icon in Video-Clip
|
|-
|Vegas
|Best New Artist
|
|-
|Vegas
|Best Group
|
|-
|rowspan=2 |2011
|Mi Stamatas
|Video Clip Hip-Hop/Urban
|
|-
|Mad About You(with Tomer G)
|Best Collaboration
|
|-
|rowspan=5 |2012
|Gia Sena
|Video of the Year
|
|-
|Gia Sena
|Video Clip Hip-Hop/Urban
|
|-
|Fili
|Fashion Icon in Video-Clip
|
|-
|Vegas
|Group of the Year
|
|-
|Vegas
|Artist of the Year
|
|-
|}

MTV EMA

|-
|2010
|Vegas
|Best Greek Act
|
|-
|rowspan=2 |2012
|Vegas
|Best Greek Act
|
|-
|Vegas
| Best European Act
|
|}

References 

Greek musical groups
MTV Europe Music Award winners